Sackville-Uniacke is a provincial electoral district in Nova Scotia, Canada. It was created as Sackville-Beaver Bank in 2012 from parts of much of Hammonds Plains-Upper Sackville and part of Waverley-Fall River-Beaver Bank. The riding also existed from 1993 to 2003. Following the 2019 riding boundary review, the riding changed names to Sackville-Uniacke, and gained parts of Hants East (Uniacke area) and a small section of Waverley-Fall River-Beaver Bank, while losing some territory to Waverley-Fall River-Beaver Bank (the Woodbine Mobile Home area).

Geography

Members of the Legislative Assembly
This riding has elected the following Members of the Legislative Assembly:

Election results

1993 general election

1998 general election

1999 general election

2013 general election 

|-

|Liberal
|Stephen Gough
|align="right"|2,570
|align="right"|40.21
|align="right"|
|-

|New Democratic Party
|Mat Whynott 
|align="right"|2,369
|align="right"|37.07
|align="right"| 
|-

|Progressive Conservative
| Sarah Reeves
|align="right"|1,452
|align="right"|22.72
|align="right"|
|}

2017 general election

2021 general election

References
Elections Nova Scotia profile 

Nova Scotia provincial electoral districts